Bang Seung-Hwan (born 25 February 1983) is a South Korean football player. He is a versatile player who can play both center back, defensive midfielder and striker based on his physical capability and football sense.

He played both positions many times in K-league classic. His debut as a centerback was the match vs Al Ayn in 2011 AFC Champions league. He got appointed as the candidate of 2011 AFC Champions league Best 11. And he played as centerback in FC Seoul which was the champion in K-league Classic. He played as centerback and striker both from that time until July 2013.

He plays for Kedah FA in 2015 Malaysia Premier League season and 2015 Malaysia Cup. He became a partner with [Khairul Helmi Johari] in the defence line. He helped Kedah FA to win Malaysia Premier League cup 2015 and qualified for Malaysia Super League 2016. He was very popular among the fans. 2017 is the successful year for him and Kedah team after they finished 3rd place on the Malaysia Super League, Semi Finalist Malaysia FA Cup and won Malaysia Cup 2016 after managed pay their revenged of the Final Malaysia Cup 2015 by beating Selangor FA with penalty spot after held 1–1 in 120 minutes.

Club career statistics

Honours

Club
Incheon United
K-League Runner-up : 2005

FC Seoul
K-League Cup Winner : 2010

Kedah
Malaysia Premier League Winner : 2015
Malaysia Cup Runner Up : 2015
Malaysia Super League 3rd : 2016
Malaysia Cup : 2016

References

External links

 

1983 births
Living people
Association football forwards
South Korean footballers
South Korean expatriate footballers
Incheon United FC players
Jeju United FC players
FC Seoul players
Busan IPark players
Bang Seung-hwan
K League 1 players
Dongguk University alumni
Expatriate footballers in Thailand
South Korean expatriate sportspeople in Thailand
South Korean expatriate sportspeople in Malaysia
Expatriate footballers in Malaysia
UiTM FC players